A referendum on a new constitution was held in Puerto Rico on 3 March 1952. It was approved by 81.9% of voters.<ref>Nohlen (2005), Elections in the Americas', p556</ref> This was considered by many U.S. and Puerto Rican politicians an affirmation of the new constitution of the island as an Estado Libre Associado, or Commonwealth, as proposed by legislation in 1950 by the United States Congress after negotiation with its political leaders. Puerto Rican nationalists question the meaning of the referendum, complaining that the only alternative offered was direct U.S. rule, and no choice of independence was offered. In 1980, the Supreme Court of the United States adjudicated (Harris v. Rosario'') that as a result of this referendum of 1952, the actual territorial status was not changed at all.

On November 1, 1950 two Puerto Rican Nationalists had attempted assassination of the United States President Harry S. Truman. They claimed they were retaliating for U.S. cooperation in repressing 1950 nationalist revolts on the island. Truman's stated motive for supporting for the plebiscite was that residents of the island could express their opinion of preferred status, but since independence was not offered, nationalists question Truman's stated motive. An overwhelming majority approved the commonwealth over the alternative of  return to direct U.S. rule.

Results

References

1952 referendums
1952
1952 in Puerto Rico
Constitutional referendums
March 1952 events in North America